The Broken Wing is a 1932 American pre-Code drama film directed by Lloyd Corrigan and written by Grover Jones and William Slavens McNutt, adapted from the play of the same name by Paul Dickey and Charles W. Goddard. The film stars Lupe Vélez, Leo Carrillo, Melvyn Douglas, George Barbier, Willard Robertson, Claire Dodd and Arthur Stone. The Broken Wing was released on March 21, 1932, by Paramount Pictures.

Plot
In a small Mexican town, Captain Innocencio (Leo Carrillo) pursues the beautiful Lolita (Lupe Vélez). Innocencio rules the town with an iron hand. Although he calls Lolita his "big love," her fortune teller assures her that another "king of hearts" awaits her, and  will come in a storm. When pilot Philip "Phil" Marvin (Melvyn Douglas), during a storm, is forced to land in Lolita's garden, she is sure he is her true love. Suffering from amnesia, Philip falls in love with her. Seeing the initials on his underwear, Lolita calls him "BVD."

when he sees him kissing Lolita, in a jealous rage, Innocencio arrests the pilot and even threatens to kill him. Lolita's American guardian, Luther Farley (George Barbier), an old friend of Innocencio, threatens to call in government troops. Moments before the pilot's execution, an American engineer, Sylvester Cross (Willard Robertson), recognizes the pilot as Philip Marvin, a prominent resident of Los Angeles.

Although it breaks Lolita's heart, to save Philip's life, Cross tells him he is married and produces his own wife claiming she is his wife. Philip, who for days, has been listening to the song of a whippoorwill suddenly recalls the opening bars of "Over There" and his time as a fighter pilot in the war. With his memory back, he assures Lolita he is not married. Enraged, Innocencio draws his revolver on Philip but government troops arrive to arrest him.

Lolita and Philip leave in an aircraft, but Innocencio escapes from prison, shouting that danger is more fun than love.

Cast

 Lupe Vélez as Lolita
 Leo Carrillo as Capt. Innocencio
 Melvyn Douglas as Philip "Phil" Marvin
 George Barbier as Luther Farley
 Willard Robertson as Sylvester Cross
 Claire Dodd as Cecelia Cross
 Arthur Stone as Justin Bailey
 Soledad Jiménez as Maria
 Julian Rivero as Bassilio
 Pietro Sosso as Pancho 
 Chris-Pin Martin as Mexican Husband
 Charles Stevens as Chicken Thief
 Joe Dominguez as Captain

Production
Principal photography on The Broken Wing was completed in mid-March 1932. While in production, the exterior sets were damaged in a rain storm, and the film reverted to interiors. The film was based on the earlier The Broken Wing, a silent film comedy-drama based on the original stage play, The Broken Wing (1920) by Paul Dickey and Charles W. Goddard.

Reception
The Broken Wing  was critically reviewed by Mordaunt Hall in The New York Times. He praised the film with the comment: "Leo Carrillo gives an ingratiating portrayal as a good-natured Mexican killer in the pictorial version of the play, 'The Broken Wing,' which is the chief attraction at the Paramount. It may not be a new story, but it makes a highly amusing entertainment and it is splendidly staged and efficiently acted by the supporting cast, which includes the vivacious Lupe Velez."

In July 1932, The Broken Wing was banned in Mexico City by the Federal District Government on the charge that the film "... slurred Mexico," and, subsequently, was also banned in Panama. While the film was being screened in Panama City, the film was abruptly stopped when a request was received from the Mexican Minister.

References

Notes

Citations

Bibliography

 Pendo, Stephen. Aviation in the Cinema. Lanham, Maryland: Scarecrow Press, 1985. .

External links
 
 

1932 films
American aviation films
American drama films
1932 drama films
Paramount Pictures films
Films directed by Lloyd Corrigan
American black-and-white films
1930s English-language films
1930s American films